The Nassau County Aquatics Center is an aquatic facility located at Eisenhower Park in East Meadow, NY.  It is considered the largest Olympic-sized single-tank pool in North America.  At least 16 world records in swimming have been set in the facility.  It was built in 1998 for the Goodwill Games.  Since the Goodwill Games in 1998, it has hosted numerous swimming championships and high level competitions including the USA Swimming National Championship, NCAA National Championship, Big East Conference Championship and FINA World Cup.  The center is 80,000 square feet with a 68m pool and three moveable bulkheads to accommodate SCM, SCY, and LCM competition.  In 2002, Natalie Coughlin set multiple world records during the FINA World Cup at the center.  In 2002 it was reported that the pool had lost millions of dollars.  Dave Ferris was aquatics director in 2002, he reportedly questioned the reported losses, stating that "I don't believe expenses on the building are completely clear at this time". In 2011, the facility underwent a renovation after a 40lbs light fixture fell about 55 feet into the swimming pool.  Since 2011 it had also been proposed to build an additional outdoor 50m pool adjacent to the existing facility.

See also 
Swimming at the Goodwill Games

References

External links

 Nassau County: Aquatic Center

Sports venues in Long Island
Swimming venues in New York (state)
Sports venues completed in 1998
1998 establishments in New York (state)
Sports venues in Nassau County, New York